Harry Alvin Siler (September 24, 1898 – April 25, 1981) was an American politician in the state of Washington. He served in the Washington House of Representatives from 1959 to 1965.

References

1981 deaths
1898 births
Republican Party members of the Washington House of Representatives
20th-century American politicians